The enzyme chondro-6-sulfatase (EC 3.1.6.10) catalyzes the reaction

4-deoxy-β-D-gluc-4-enuronosyl-(1→3)-N-acetyl-D-galactosamine 6-sulfate + H2O  4-deoxy-β-D-gluc-4-enuronosyl-(1→3)-N-acetyl-D-galactosamine + sulfate

This enzyme belongs to the family of hydrolases, specifically those acting on sulfuric ester bonds.  The systematic name is 4-deoxy-β-D-gluc-4-enuronosyl-(1→3)-N-acetyl-D-galactosamine-6-sulfate 6-sulfohydrolase.

References

EC 3.1.6
Enzymes of unknown structure